Franz Bernhard Lucas (September 15, 1911, in Osnabrück – December 7, 1994, in Elmshorn) was a German concentration camp doctor.

Early life and education
Franz Lucas was the son of a butcher. After attending school in Osnabrück and Meppen, he passed his Abitur in 1933. He studied four semesters of Philology in Münster, and graduated in medical studies in Rostock and Danzig/Gdansk in 1942, where in the same year he was awarded his medical doctorate.

Nazi career
From June 1933 to September 1934 he was a member of the SA. On May 1, 1937, he joined the NSDAP. On November 15, 1937, he got into the SS (No. 350 030) reaching the rank of SS First Lieutenant in 1943. In 1942, Lucas received a two-month training course under a leading contender in the Waffen-SS medical academy in Graz.

Thereafter, he became a medical officer in Nuremberg and Belgrade. Because of "defeatist remarks", Lucas had to serve a short time in a probation unit. On September 27, 1943, he received a letter with a new assignment. He was summoned to the Führungshauptamt - Office Group D - in order to provide medical services to the Waffen SS in Berlin beginning on October 1. As of December 15, 1943, he was transferred to the Office D III for Sanitation and Camp Hygiene of WVHA in Oranienburg, led by Enno Lolling.

From mid-December 1943 to late summer 1944, Lucas was a camp doctor in I Auschwitz (Truppenarzt) and operating in the Auschwitz concentration camp (Gypsy camp, Theresienstadt family camp). Afterwards, he had further short-term missions in the Mauthausen concentration camp in 1944, Stutthof concentration camp in 1944, Ravensbrück Concentration Camp in 1944 and Sachsenhausen in January 1945, where he served in March 1945 and appeared in Berlin with a letter of recommendation from a female Norwegian prisoner from the Ravensbrück concentration camp. Before the Battle of Berlin Lucas fled in April 1945 to the west.

His colleague in Ravensbrück Percy Treite said during the first Ravensbrück process about him: "Dr. Lucas was not under my responsibility, he took part in selections for the gas chamber and in shootings. After disagreements with Dr. Trommer, he went to Sachsenhausen and was sent as a punishment by all camps in Germany." The reason for this disagreement with Treite was that Lucas was issuing death certificates for the deceased prisoners from the concentration camp Uckermark, but they would never take a closer look. In addition, Treite has been present during the first shootings, after he had denied his participation and Lucas had to take over the activities; but Lucas denied this after a few days.

Post-war
Immediately after the war, Lucas escaped the denazification process and immediately got a job at the city hospital in Elmshorn, first as a medical assistant, then as assistant medical director and finally as chief physician of the gynecological department. On learning of the charges against him, he lost his job in 1963 and worked in private practice.

Auschwitz trial
During the Frankfurt Auschwitz trials held between 1963–1965, Lucas first denied having carried out selections, he also denied that he had authorised the use of Zyklon B in the gas chambers and had supervised the killings. Testimony statements contradicted his story.

On the 87th day of the trial Helen Goldmann a Jewish girl originally from Czechoslovakia, who was deported to Auschwitz in May 1944, testified that Dr Lucas threw her two year old sister on the floor, selecting her mother, her sister, and a second three year old sister, and her brother to be murdered the gaschambers.   She was told later that day "If Doctor Lucas was at the station picking them right and left, he says, then my mother and the children are not going to be living long, they're going to be killed the same day."

On the 137th day of the trial, one of the defendants gave evidence for the first time as a witness against a co-defendant in a concentration camp trial. Former SS guard Stefan Baretzki: "I was not blind when Dr. Lucas had selected on the ramp. ... Five thousand men, he sent them in half an hour, and today he wants to stand as a savior." Lucas now agreed that he had been involved in four selections but claimed he had been obeying orders & had conducted the selections against his will.

The jury in Frankfurt found him guilty of selecting at least one thousand people in at least four separate selections and sentenced him on 20 August 1965 to a total of three years and three months imprisonment. On 26 March 1968, Lucas was released from custody. When the verdict was reviewed by the Federal Supreme Court on 20 February 1969 it was decided that the question of the "compulsion at the ramp" of Auschwitz must be rethought due to the positive character image of Lucas presented in the trial. On 8 October 1970, he was released. During these proceedings, many prisoners spoke positively about Lucas, while the statements that led to his earlier condemnation were judged to be based on hearsay.

Lucas was "involved in the extermination of human beings", but "did not deal with perpetrators, but only against his will", citing the so-called "putative emergency" according to § 52 StGB. Therefore, "no charge of guilt in the criminal sense" could be made.

Later life and death
From 1970 to 30 September 1983, he again worked in his own private practice and died on 7 December 1994.

Further reading
Ernst Klee : Auschwitz. Perpetrators, agents, victims and what became of them. A Personenlexikon. S. Fischer, Frankfurt am Main 2013.  .
Ernst Klee : The person encyclopedia to the Third Reich: Who was before what and 1945. Fischer paperback publishing house, Frankfurt 2005  .
Silke Schäfer: For self-image of women in the concentration camp. The camp Ravensbrück. (PDF; 759 kB) Berlin 2002.
Hermann Langbein : People in Auschwitz Frankfurt, Berlin Wien, Ullstein Verlag, 1980.

References 

1911 births
1994 deaths
Auschwitz concentration camp medical personnel
SS-Obersturmführer
People from Osnabrück
People from the Province of Hanover
Holocaust perpetrators in Poland
Romani genocide perpetrators